Robert Herschel Donaldson (born June 14, 1943) is an American political scientist.

Donaldson attended Harvard University.  He completed his Bachelor of Arts magna cum laude in 1964, his Master of Arts in 1966, and his Ph.D. in 1969.  His doctoral dissertation analyzed the Soviet Union's economic policies.  He was admitted to the Phi Beta Kappa Society as an undergraduate and has remained active in the organization as a professor.

Donaldson began his teaching career at Vanderbilt University, where he rose from assistant professor to full professor and associate dean of the College of Arts and Science.  In 1981 he became the provost of Lehman College at the City University of New York. In 1984 he became president of Fairleigh Dickinson University and served until 1990, when he became president of the University of Tulsa. He worked to raise the university's profile through international conferences in Tulsa and exchange programs, particularly with institutions in Russia. His tenure as president was "marked by change and criticism," including a unanimous vote of no confidence by the student government. "Citing 'institutional stresses' and conflicting expectations among school constituencies," he resigned as president in 1996.

After stepping down as president, Donaldson remained at the University of Tulsa as a professor of political science until his retirement in 2013.

References

External links 
 Robert H. Donaldson's University of Tulsa website
 Robert H. Donaldson's university resumé 
 Jersey College Chief Leaving for Tulsa Post, The New York Times, March 22, 1990
 Schools in U.S. And Russia Set Up An Exchange Plan, The New York Times, October 20, 1991

1943 births
Living people
American political scientists
Harvard College alumni
Vanderbilt University faculty
Fairleigh Dickinson University faculty
Presidents of the University of Tulsa
City University of New York faculty
Harvard Graduate School of Arts and Sciences alumni